Ubique was a software company based in Israel.

In 1994 the company launched the first social-networking software, which included instant messaging, voice over IP (Commonly known as VoIP), chat rooms, web-based events, collaborative browsing. It is best known for the Virtual Places software product and the technology used by
Lotus Sametime. It is now part of IBM Haifa Labs.

Technology

Virtual Places 
Ubique's best-known product is Virtual Places, a presence-based chat program in which users explore web sites together. It is used by providers such as VPChat and Digital Space and eventually evolved into Lotus Sametime.

Virtual Places requires a server and client software. Users start Virtual Places along with a web
browser and sign into the Virtual Places server. Avatars are overlaid onto the web browser and
users are able to collaborate with each other while they all visit web sites in real time.

Some Virtual Places consumer-oriented communities are still alive on the Web and are using the old version of it.

Instant Messaging and Chat 

With the technology developed for Virtual Places, Ubique created an instant messaging and
presence technology platform which evolved into Lotus Sametime.

History 
1994 – Ubique Ltd was founded in Israel by Ehud Shapiro and a group of scientists from
the Weizmann Institute to develop real-time, distributed computing products. The
company developed a presence-based chat system known as Virtual Places along with real-time
instant messaging and presence technology software. These were the very early days of the web, which at the time had only static data. Ubique's mission was "to add people to the web".

1995 – America Online Inc. purchased Ubique with the intention to use Ubique's Virtual
Places technology to enhance and expand its existing live online interactive communication for both the AOL consumer online service and the new GNN brand service. Only the GNN-branded Virtual Places product was ever released.

1996 – GNN was discontinued in 1996. Ubique's management, with the support of AOL, decided to look for other markets for Virtual Places technology. The outcome was that Ubique shifted Virtual Places from the consumer market to focus on presence technology and instant messaging for the corporate market. AOL divested Ubique but remained as a principal investor while Ubique sought a new owner.

1998 - Ubique was acquired by Lotus/IBM to integrate the core
technology of instant messaging and presence functions into a software product integrated with Lotus/IBM.

2000 - Lotus announced Lotus Sametime using Ubique's technology.

2006 - Elements of Ubique along with other Israeli-based companies were integrated into the
newly created IBM Haifa Labs. The Lab develops Session Initiation Protocol (SIP) infrastructure and features of real-time collaboration, including session management, presence awareness, subscriptions and notifications, text messaging, developer toolkits, and mobile real-time messaging infrastructure.

References

External links 
IBM Haifa Labs website

Instant messaging
Software companies of Israel
Israeli companies established in 1994
IBM acquisitions